Gegan is a surname. Notable people with this surname include:

 James Gegan Miller (born 1942), American physicist, engineer, and inventor
 Judy Gegan (born 1944), British swimmer
 Walter Gegan (1899–1931), American middle-distance runner

See also
 Gehan